Diplodactylus wiru, sometimes called the desert wood gecko, is a gecko endemic to Australia.

References

Diplodactylus
Geckos of Australia
Reptiles described in 2009
Taxa named by Mark Norman Hutchinson
Taxa named by Paul Doughty
Taxa named by Paul M. Oliver